Zach Grenier is an American character actor of film, television and stage. He is best known for his roles in films such as Fight Club, Tommy Boy, and Twister and for his roles in television such as David Lee in The Good Wife and Andy Cramed in Deadwood.

Life and career
Grenier's mother, who was an announcer on a Polish radio program, met his father when he was working as a sound engineer at WBNX in the Bronx in the late 1930s.

He was a regular cast member on C-16 from 1997 to 1998.<ref>Terrace, Vincent. Encyclopedia of Television Shows, 1925 through 2007 (Jefferson, North Carolina: McFarland & Co., 2008), p.331.</ref>

He appeared in the first season of the television show 24 as Carl Webb; played Andy Cramed, the gambler who brought the plague to town, on Deadwood; and appeared in several episodes of Law & Order.  On film he played Edward Norton's boss in Fight Club and Mel Nicolai in Zodiac, both David Fincher films. He appeared in the 1988 movie Talk Radio as finance guru Sid Greenberg, a role that he played in the original stage version of the script. In the movie Twister, he played Eddie, Dr. Jonas Miller's assistant. He played Mr. Reilly, one of the Callahan Auto Parts associates, in Tommy Boy. He appeared in Donnie Brasco as a marriage therapist. He played a role of Professor Cardiff in a 2006 horror film Pulse.

In 2009, he appeared on Broadway opposite Jane Fonda in 33 Variations, earning him a Tony Award nomination.

In 2010, he was cast on the television series The Good Wife'' as David Lee, a senior attorney, a role that soon became part of the recurring ensemble. He was promoted to series regular at the start of the fifth season in September 2013.

Filmography

References

External links
 
 
 
 

American male film actors
American male stage actors
American male television actors
Living people
Year of birth missing (living people)
20th-century American male actors
21st-century American male actors
American people of Polish descent